Marie Joseph Hector Allard (May 11, 1902 – March 24, 1984) was a Canadian diplomat. He was the Permanent Delegate to the United Nations and in 1957, appointed Ambassador Extraordinary and Plenipotentiary to Cuba, Dominican Republic, and Haiti, and in 1960, Ambassador Extraordinary and Plenipotentiary to Denmark.

He was born in St. Laurent, Manitoba and was a Rhodes Scholar at Oxford University.

References

Sources

The Canadian Who's who. (1983)

External links
Foreign Affairs and International Trade Canada Complete List of Posts 
Fonds Hector Allard (12356) at Library and Archives Canada. The description of the fonds is in French.

1902 births
1984 deaths
Ambassadors of Canada to Haiti
Franco-Manitoban people
People from Interlake Region, Manitoba
Permanent Representatives of Canada to the United Nations
Ambassadors of Canada to Cuba
Ambassadors of Canada to the Dominican Republic
Ambassadors of Canada to Denmark